Moravia is the fourteenth canton in the San José province of Costa Rica. The head city of the canton is San Vicente.

Toponymy
It is named in honour of President Juan Rafael Mora Porras (1814 – 1860). Since there was already a canton called Mora, this one was named Moravia.

History 
Moravia was created on 1 August 1914 by decree 55.

Law No. 55 established Villa San Vicente on 1 August 1914. The first session of the Council of Moravia was held on 19 January 1915, and the first electric street lighting was installed in the same year. Law No. 3248 gave the town of San Vicente city status on 6 December 1963.

Geography 
Moravia has an area of  km² and a mean elevation of  metres.

The elongated canton begins in the northern suburbs of the national capital city of San José and continues northeast toward the Cordillera Central (Central Mountain Range). The Virilla, Pará, and Blanco rivers on the north and west, and the Quebrada Azul and Macho rivers on the southeast, partially delineate the boundaries of the canton.

Other rivers in Moravia include Quebrada Barreal, Quebrada Lajas, Quebrada San Francisco, Quebrada Tornillal, Quebrada Yerbabuena, Acequia, Agrá, Hondura, Ipís, Pará Grande, Paracito, and Zurquí. Mountain peaks in the area include Zurquí (1,583m), Vargas (1,396m), and Trina (1,270m).

Moravia combines densely populated suburbs in the south with rural mountain landscapes in the San Jerónimo district to the north. The cantons surrounding Moravia are Vázquez de Coronado to the east and north, San Isidro, Santo Domingo, and Tibás to the west, and Goicoechea to the south.

Districts 
The canton of Moravia is subdivided into the following districts:
 San Vicente
 San Jerónimo
 La Trinidad

Demographics 

For the 2011 census, Moravia had a population of  inhabitants.

Education
The first school was founded in 1848, called "school for the education of the children of the residents of San Vicente", and was located on the north side of the current San Vicente city park, called Parque de Moravia. A charity school was created in 1862, with two sections, one for boys and one for women.

In 1891, an adobe and brick building was created for the school and this was renamed Escuela Graduada de Varones de San Vicente (Graduate School for Boys of Saint Vincent) in 1893. Two years later, the name Graduada de Mujeres de San Vicente (Graduate School of Women of Saint Vincent) was added and these names were maintained until 1932, when the school was renamed again as Escuela Porfirio Brenes Castro, its current name. The school Porfirio Brenes Castro now occupies a city block to the south of Parque de Moravia.

The private school, Saint Francis College, was founded on 23 February 1950, and another school, "Colegio Nuestra Señora de Sión", "Saint Anthony School", "Saint Joseph",Liceo de Moravia, began teaching in March 1966., and Liceo Laboratorio Emma Gamboa.

Costa Rica's Japanese international school, Escuela Japonesa de San José (サンホセ日本人学校 Sanhose Nihonjin Gakkō), is located in Moravia.

Transportation

Road transportation 
The canton is covered by the following road routes:

References 

Cantons of San José Province
Populated places in San José Province